Democratic Popular Party may refer to:-

 The Social Democratic Party (Portugal) formerly known as Democratic Popular Party 
 The Popular Democratic Party of Puerto Rico
 The Democratic Popular Party (Spain) 
 The Popular Democratic Party (France)